Tomoplagia propleuralis is a species of tephritid or fruit flies in the genus Tomoplagia of the family Tephritidae.

Distribution
Puerto Rico.

References

Tephritinae
Insects described in 1955
Diptera of South America